The Royal Preston Hospital or RPH, is an acute general hospital in Preston, Lancashire, England. It is managed by the Lancashire Teaching Hospitals NHS Foundation Trust.

History
The hospital was built in stages between 1975 and 1983; it was officially opened by the Princess of Wales on 1 June 1983. Further expansion took place to accommodate services transferred from the Preston Royal Infirmary, which closed in 1990, and the Sharoe Green Hospital which closed in 1992. A new children's unit was added in 1994 and a dedicated day case surgery unit was completed in 1996.

Those reported to have died at the hospital include the 6th Duke of Westminster who died on 9 August 2016, after suffering a heart attack at his Abbeystead estate.

References

External links
Official site

Hospital buildings completed in 1983
Buildings and structures in Preston
Hospitals in Lancashire
NHS hospitals in England